Pekka Erkki Juhani Tammilehto (27 October 1952 – 13 August 2011), better known by his stage name Topi Sorsakoski, was a Finnish singer. His father was Finnish tango singer Yrjö Johannes "Tapio" Tammilehto.

Career
Sorsakoski started his career together with his brother, Antti, who had played in various bands together with Juice Leskinen, in the Kalle Kiwes Blues Band. Some of Sorsakoski's cousins are also musicians: Seppo Tammilehto, who played in Alwari Tuohitorvi and later had a solo career; and Juhani Tammela, who has played old dancehall music in his quintet in the 1960s. Next Sorsakoski worked as the guitarist in the band The Boys. 

In the 1980s, he started performing together with the band Agents, also singing songs earlier performed by Olavi Virta. Sorsakoski later had a solo career and also worked with the band Kulkukoirat. He returned to for a time to the Agents beginning in May 2007.

Death
Sorsakoski died on Saturday, 13 August 2011 at Seinäjoki Central Hospital. He was 58 years old and had suffered from lung cancer.

Discography

Albums
Hurmio (1985)
In Beat (1986) – by Topi Sorsakoski & Agents
Besame Mucho (1987) – by Topi Sorsakoski & Agents
Pop (1988) – by Topi Sorsakoski & Agents
Half and Half (1990) – by Topi Sorsakoski & Agents
Yksinäisyys (1991)
Kulkukoirat (1992) – by Topi Sorsakoski & Reijo Taipale:
Iltarusko (1995)
Yksinäisyys osa 2 (1995)
Kalliovuorten kuu (1997)
Evergreens (1999)
Muukalainen (2000)
Luotu lähtemään (2002) – by Topi Sorsakoski & Kulkukoirat
Jossakin... Suomessa (2005) – by Topi Sorsakoski & Kulkukoirat
Renegades (2007) – by Topi Sorsakoski & Agents
Tummansininen sävel (2011)

Compilations
Topi Sorsakoski & Agents:
 Greatest Hits (1988)
 In memoriam (1992)
 Muistojen peili (2000)
 Muistojen peili 2 (2002)
 Surujen kitara – 32 Greatest Hits (2002)
 Muistojeni laulut – 30 hienointa levytystä (2008)

References

1952 births
2011 deaths
Parlophone artists
People from Ähtäri
20th-century Finnish male singers
Deaths from lung cancer
Deaths from cancer in Finland